Jerry Carlson has two intertwined careers, that of an academic and that of a maker of documentary films and television shows.

Academic career
Carlson is a specialist in narrative theory, global independent film, and the cinemas of the Americas. He is Director of the Cinema Studies program at the City University of New York and is a member of the doctoral faculties of French, Film Studies, and Comparative Literature at the CUNY Graduate Center, where he is also a Senior Fellow of the Bildner Center for Western Hemispheric Studies. His current research is focused on how slavery and its legacy in the New World have been represented in film, literature, and music. In addition to his work at CUNY, Carlson has lectured at Escuela Internacional de Cine y TV (Cuba), the University of Paris, the University of Sao Paulo, Stanford University, and Columbia University.

Film and television
Carlson is also a producer, director, and writer for television and documentary films. Carlson created, produces, and hosts CUNY TV’s weekly movie showcase, City Cinematheque. He created and produced Charlando con Cervantes, a 40 part series of interviews with artists from Spain and Spanish America. He also created, produced, and hosted Canape about French-American cultural relations, and Nueva York (in Spanish) about the Latino cultures of New York City. He has produced more than 50 episodes of television dedicated to Latin American cinema and has been involved in the enhanced recognition of Cuban film. His work has won him a total of 9 New York Emmy Awards. Carlson is also a judge for the New York Indian Film Festival

In regards to his own films, Carlson produced the Showtime Networks' Dirt (2003), which was directed by Nancy Savoca and Looking for Palladin (2008), which was directed by Andrzej Krakowski.

He was inducted by the government of France as a Chevalier in the Ordre des Palmes Académiques in 1998.

Personal life and education
Carlson was raised in Dallas, Texas, where he graduated from St. Mark's School of Texas in 1968. He received his undergraduate degree from Williams College in 1972 and then earned his A.M. and Ph.D. at the University of Chicago. He is married to Deborah Navins.

References 

American documentary film directors
Year of birth missing (living people)
Living people
Williams College alumni
University of Chicago alumni
Graduate Center, CUNY faculty
St. Mark's School (Texas) alumni